TRAU FC (known fully as Tiddim Road Athletic Union Football Club) is an Indian professional multi-sports club known for its association football team. Based in Imphal, Manipur, the club competes in I-League, the second tier of Indian football league system. Nicknamed "red pythons", the club was founded in 1954.

TRAU made its I-League 2nd Division debut in 2017–18 season. They were promoted to the I-League in 2019, after winning 2nd Division. The club also participate in Manipur State League.

History
Tiddim Road Athletic Union, which was instituted on 2 October 1954 in Kwakeithel, Imphal, has been a pioneering organisation in the field of sports activities. They have lifted the title of CC Meet, state league of Manipur six times and finished runners up nine times. TRAU was runners up in 1998 Bordoloi Trophy, losing 10–1 to Narbakhar FC, club from Uzbekistan in the final. They began their journey of I-League 2nd Division in 2018, and on 8 May, they qualified for the final round in I-League Qualifiers in their debut season.

In 2018–19 season, they won the I-League 2nd division, their first ever professional league trophy, and gained the promotion to the I-League.

On 25 August 2019, TRAU announced Aciesta Sports Alliance Private Limited as its title sponsor. The deal with Aciesta will help the Manipur-based team finance its first-team and development activities and further expand its presence in the top tier of Indian football.

Prior to the announcement, TRAU FC signed an agreement with SportiFan Ventures Limited, a sports business management firm based in the United Kingdom, which played a pivotal role in the negotiation process for the aforementioned deal.
Later on the club announced Romi Factory as their new kit partner. On 23 October 2019, they roped in Douglas Silva as new manager, and on 1 December, they faced Chennai City. Shortly, his tenure ended as they lost the first three matches as the Brazilian was not at all happy with the supervision of the team.

In the 2020–21 I-League season, which was their second I-League season, TRAU finished at the 3rd position with 26 points. Bidyashagar Singh with 12 goals in 15 matches emerged as the top scorer and became the fourth Indian player to win the Golden boot. TRAU achieved ninth place in 2021–22 I-League.

Kit manufacturers and shirt sponsors

Stadium

Khuman Lampak Main Stadium in Imphal, Manipur is used as the home ground of TRAU for all their home matches in both the domestic and regional leagues. Opened in 1999, the stadium has a capacity of 35,285 spectators.

Support and rivalry

Supporters
A club recognised Imphal fan club by the name "Red Pythons" has been in support since 2017. The Khuman Lampak Main Stadium has seen an average attendance of 35,000.

Rivalries

TRAU FC have participated in the Imphal Derby with their city rivals NEROCA FC. The two clubs are the only two from Imphal to have played professional league football. The Imphal Derby gained fame in 2022 during the 131st edition of Durand Cup when competitive football returned to the city after COVID-19 pandemic in India. The Government of Manipur declared a half-holiday for all governmental and educational institutions in build-up to the match on 18 August, in which TRAU was defeated by NEROCA 3–1 in Group-C opener.

The club has also enjoyed a rivalry with another Northeast Indian club Aizawl FC at the domestic level.

Players

First-team squad

Current technical staff

Team records

Recent seasons

Head coaching record
updated on 16 February 2020 

  Caretaker Manager

Top scorer
{| class="wikitable sortable" style="text-align:center"
|-
! scope="col | Season
! class="unsortable" | Player
! class="unsortable" | Goals
|-
| 2017–18
| align="left" | Princewill Emeka
|7
|-
| 2018–19
| align="left" | Princewill Emeka
|10
|-
|2019–20
| align="left" | Oguchi Uche
|4
|-
|2020–21
| align="left" | Bidyashagar Singh
|12
|}

Notable players
Past and present internationals

The players below have senior/youth international cap(s) for their respective countries. Players whose name is listed, represented their countries before or after playing for TRAU FC''.

 Isaac Isinde 
 Oguchi Uche 
 Petru Leucă 
 Gerard Williams 
 Komron Tursunov 
 Akobir Turaev 
 Gerson Vieira

Honours

Domestic tournaments

League
I-League
Third place (1): 2020–21
I-League 2nd Division
Champions (1): 2018–19
Manipur State League
Champions (2): 2006, 2010
Runners-up (2): 2011 2016

Cup
Bordoloi Trophy
Runners-up (1): 1998
 Churachand Singh Trophy
Winners (6): 1960, 1961, 1974, 1981, 2004, 2009
Runners-up (7): 1963, 1964, 1965, 1970, 1988, 1989, 2013–14
 Tiddim Invitation Football Trophy
Champions (1): 2007
 Mayanglambam Chittamani Memorial Cup
Runners-up (1): 2004

Awards
 AIFF Fair Play Award: 2022–23

Other department

Futsal
The club has a men's futsal section, which took part in the inaugural edition of AIFF Futsal Club Championship.

See also
 List of football clubs in Manipur
 Sports in Manipur

References

External links

TRAU FC at ESPN
 TRAU FC at WorldFootball.net
TRAU FC at Global Sports Archive

 
Association football clubs established in 1954
Football clubs in Manipur
I-League clubs
I-League 2nd Division clubs
1954 establishments in Manipur